Grigoropolisskaya is a rural locality (a stanitsa) in Novoalexandrovsky District of Stavropol Krai, Russia, located near the Kuban River. Population:

References

Rural localities in Stavropol Krai